Camus Cognac is a brand of cognac that has been produced by five generations of the Camus family, since 1863 when Jean-Baptiste Camus organized a group of producers to sell cognac under the brand 'La Grande Marque'.

Today, Cyril Camus—the fifth generation of the Camus family—heads the company which counts 500 employees in eight countries on three continents. Camus products are sold in most countries in the world, in almost every international airport and on board a large number of airlines.

Five generations

Jean-Baptiste Camus
Jean-Baptiste Camus (1835–1901) started as an independent winegrower, distilling and selling his cognac to established cognac houses. In 1863 he decided to organize a consortium of producers to guarantee a consistent level of quality in terms of production and supplies of mature stocks of cognac, and founded ‘La Grande Marque’ as the brand under which to sell them.
England was the first export market for La Grande Marque. To establish the principle that the Camus family must have total control of the process from the grape to the glass, Jean-Baptiste bought his partners’ shares and created "Camus La Grande Marque".

Edmond and Gaston Camus

Jean-Baptiste's elder son, Edmond (1859–1933), entered the company in 1894 as Master Blender, helping his father with all aspects of production. Under his direction, Camus gained further recognition for the quality of its cognacs, and was among the first cognac houses to sell cognac in labelled bottles instead of barrels, helping to establish the brand name. He also developed sales on the French market.

Edmond's younger brother, Gaston (1865–1945), joined the company in 1896 and devoted himself to export sales. He developed a business in Russia, where Camus became the official cognac of the Court of the last Tsar.

Michel Camus

Michel Camus (1911–1985) was only 21 when he joined the firm in 1932. He continued to build Camus' relationship with Russia, winning an exclusive spirits export and import contract between France and Russia in 1959.

In the early 1960s he started doing business with American group DFS Galleria. He introduced a variety of gift presentations targeted at travellers, including items such as Limoges porcelain and Baccarat crystal decanters, and first promoted the superior Napoléon quality in a signature frosted bottle.

Jean-Paul Camus

Born in 1945 and joining the company to help his father as Master Blender in 1977, Jean-Paul Camus bought new vineyards, distilleries and storage capacity, focussing mainly around the traditional family base in the Borderies growing area.

He also pursued his father's commercial policy in duty-free, developing sales in airports and airlines in the Asia-Pacific region. Camus Napoleon was the best selling cognac of the 1980s, with annual profits of over $100 million thanks to the exclusive worldwide sales rights with Chuck Feeney through DFS Galleria. This became the most popular cognac in Japan.

Cyril Camus

Cyril Camus, born in 1971, completed a business degree at Babson College in the US before joining CAMUS as the company's Trade Relations Director in Beijing, China in 1994. 
He returned to Cognac in 1998 as Marketing Director, overseeing the creation of numerous new products for the duty-free market. He also developed the Company's signature Borderies XO, a pure Borderies blend from the family's own vineyards, and a new cognac from Île de Ré. Becoming President in 2004, Cyril developed the Camus Elegance range.

Timeline  

1863 – Founding of the Company
1910 – Became the official cognac at the court of the Tsar of Russia
1960 – Entered the duty-free market
1971 – Opening the first office in Hong-Kong
1991 – Expansion of the vineyards in the Borderies region
2000 – First release of Camus Borderies XO, the company's flagship product
2007 – Founding of Yuanliu, the company's China subsidiary
2008 – Activation of CIL US, the company's USA subsidiary. Opening of the Camus Vietnam Office
2009 – Opening of the first Maison Camus store, and first Maison Camus Lounge in Beijing

References

External links
 Camus homepage
 Interview Cyril Camus: Camus Cognac finds a brave new world in China 

Cognac